Mandor panchayat samiti  is a panchayat samiti in Jodhpur District of Rajasthan state in western India.

Mandor panchayat samiti is a central the in Jodhpur District.  It borders Osian panchayat samiti and Bawadi panchayat samiti to the north, Bhopalgarh panchayat samiti to the northeast, Luni panchayat samiti to the south, and Balesar panchayat samiti to the west.

History
In 2009 Mandor panchayat samiti was created out of the rural portion of Jodhpur District. Jodhpur conectarte is an island in Mandor panchayat samiti.

Demographics
In the 2001 Indian census, the rural population of Jodhpur conectarte which became Mandor panchayat samiti recorded 208,836 inhabitants of which 109,560 (52.5%) were male and 99,276 (47.5%) were female, for a gender ratio of 906 females per thousand males. In 2001 in the area that became Mandor tehsil, 100% of the households were rural.

Villages
There are twenty-eight panchayat villages in Mandor panchayat samiti.  These are the panchayat villages and subject villages, with the exception of where they are not yet mapped (NYM):

Notes

Tehsils of Rajasthan
Jodhpur district